Laetilia obscura is a species of snout moth in the genus Laetilia. It was described by Harrison Gray Dyar Jr. in 1918. It is found on Cuba.

References

Moths described in 1918
Phycitini
Endemic fauna of Cuba